Pavel Harçik (born 5 April 1979) is a former Turkmenistani professional football goalkeeper.  He is ethnically Russian.

Career statistics

Club

International

Statistics accurate as of match played 18 April 2009

References

External links

1979 births
Living people
FC Rubin Kazan players
Turkmenistan footballers
Turkmenistan expatriate footballers
Turkmenistan international footballers
FC Nisa Aşgabat players
FC Anzhi Makhachkala players
Turkmenistan expatriate sportspeople in Russia
Expatriate footballers in Russia
Russian Premier League players
Turkmenistan expatriate sportspeople in Azerbaijan
Expatriate footballers in Azerbaijan
FC AGMK players
Sportspeople from Dushanbe
Turkmenistan people of Russian descent
Footballers at the 2002 Asian Games
FC Kristall Smolensk players
Association football goalkeepers
FC Neftekhimik Nizhnekamsk players
FK Karvan players
Asian Games competitors for Turkmenistan